Cast off may refer to:
 Cast off (knitting), another term for binding off
 Castoff (publishing), estimating the number of bookbinding signatures required to typeset a manuscript
 Offcasting, a concept in the science fiction of the mathematician Ian Stewart and Jack Cohen